The G family of Mazda engines is a family of large inline-four piston engines that was commercialized from 1989 to 2001. The series started at 2.6 L for the Mazda B-Series truck from 1988. Prior to that, a 2.6 L Mitsubishi engine had been used.

G54B
The 2.6 L Mazda G54B was actually a Mitsubishi engine. It displaces  and was used in the B2600 pickup from 1986 to 1988, until Mazda developed their own suitable engine.

G6
Mazda replaced the G54B with its own 2.6 L G6 engine which displaces . The G6 was produced until 2006 and made 121 hp (90 kW), 149 lb⋅ft (202 N⋅m) (North America)

Compression Ratio: 8.4 

Valve train: 12V SOHC

Applications:
 1988-2006 Mazda B2600
 1989-1996 Mazda MPV

G5
The 2.5 L G5 was an evolution of the G6. It produces  at 4000 rpm.

Applications:
 1995 Mazda B2500
 1996-1999 Mazda MPV

GY
The GY is not at all related to the Mazda G-series four-cylinder engines and is listed in this article strictly by engine code association. GY is the Mazda engine code for a  Ford Duratec V6 engine which, due to an OEM deal with Ford, was built by Mazda in Japan for limited use in the 1999-2001 Mazda MPV. This Duratec V6 engine was in turn based on the original Mazda KL  from 1991. By the late 1990s (during the Mazda/Ford partnership) Ford executives had ordered Mazda to cease development of V6 engines and instead focus on a new range of four-cylinder engines for both companies' benefit, which would become the MZR/Duratec lineup of inline-four engines. The order to discontinue their own V6 development included the Mazda K engine, leaving Mazda the only option of employing later Ford V6s, which were considerably cheaper to manufacture.

Applications:
 1999-2001 Mazda MPV (second generation)

See also
 Mazda engines

References

G
Straight-four engines